St. Mary the Virgin is a parish church in the united benefice of Chiddingstone, Penshurst, Chiddingstone Causeway and Fordcombe in the episcopal Diocese of Rochester. It is a Grade II* listed building with Historic England.

References

Grade II* listed churches in Kent
Diocese of Rochester